The Ministry of Justice, Human Rights and Civic Promotion, Keeper of the Seals of Burkina Faso is responsible for the following:

 Justice (organization of the judicial system, independence of the judiciary, litigation management or law enforcement),
 Human rights (international and national legal aspects, education, promotion and defense techniques, judicial protection), Democracy (legal framework, judicial aspects, promotion activities),
 Fight against corruption (International and national legal aspects, prevention and control techniques, link with transnational organized crime),
 Public procurement (legislative and regulatory framework, litigation management, education),
 Elections (legislative and regulatory framework, litigation management),
 Decentralization (legislative and regulatory framework, education, litigation management).

List of ministers (Post-1960 when the country achieved independence) 

 Moussa Kargougou (1962-1964)
 Denis Yameogo (1965)
 Bagnamou Bonde (1966-1970)*
 Malick Zorome (1971-1974)*
 Sangoule Lamizana (1974)*
 Bagnamou Bonde (1975)*
 Francois Xavier Zonco (1976-1978)*
 Moise Lankoande (1979-1980)*
 Bema Ouatarra (1981-1982)*
 Marie Louise Nignan-Bassolet (1982-1983)* [1st female]
 Raymond Poda (1984)*
 Blaise Compaore (1985-1987)
 Salif Sampebogo (1988-1989)
 Antoine Komy Sambo (1990-1991)
 Benoit Lompo (1992)
 Timothee Some (1993-1994)
 Larba Yarga (1995-1999)
 Boureima Badini (1999-2007)
 Zakalia Koté (2007-2011)
 Jerome Traoré (2011-2014)
 Joséphine Ouédraogo (2014-2016) 
 Bessolé René Bagoro (2016-present)

*The country was known as Upper Volta until 1984 when it was renamed Burkina Faso.

See also 

 Justice ministry
 Politics of Burkina Faso

References 

Justice ministries
Government of Burkina Faso